Kirk Patrick Snyder (born June 5, 1983) is a former American professional basketball player.

College
Snyder grew up in Upland, California, and spent his college career at University of Nevada. In 2004, he led the Wolf Pack to its first Sweet 16 in the NCAA tournament. During that trip, the team beat No. 2 seed Gonzaga and No. 7 seed Michigan State, but lost in the third round to No. 3 and eventual National Champion runner-up Georgia Tech.

Professional career

Snyder was drafted in the first round (16th overall) of the 2004 NBA draft by the Utah Jazz. After one season, he was traded to the New Orleans Hornets as part one of the largest trades in NBA history (13 players, 5 teams involved).

In New Orleans, Snyder became a starter midway through his only season. He scored a career-high 28 points against the Minnesota Timberwolves, and averaged nearly 20 minutes per game in 68 contests. After that, he was traded to the Houston Rockets for a 2008 second-round draft pick and cash considerations.

On February 21, 2008, as he was often the last man from the Rockets' bench, Snyder was traded to the Minnesota Timberwolves along with a 2010 second-round draft pick and cash considerations for Gerald Green.

During the 2008 off-season, Snyder signed with the Chinese Basketball Association's Zhejiang Horses.

Snyder later joined the Halifax Rainmen of the Premier Basketball League (PBL). After playing three games for Halifax in late January, 2011, they waived him.

In March 2011 he signed with BC Nizhny Novgorod in Russia until the end of the season, but left the team in April for personal reasons.

Personal life
Snyder married his college sweetheart Haley Dahl, and has three children. Haley is the cousin of NFL offensive line guard Harvey Dahl, who also attended Nevada, and played Wolf Pack football there. Snyder and Dahl have since divorced.

Snyder was arrested on March 30, 2009 after he allegedly broke into a Warren County, Ohio home and assaulted a man, sheriff deputies said. He was charged with aggravated burglary; he pleaded not guilty by reason of insanity at a March 31, 2009 hearing and was held on $500,000 bail.

He was subsequently convicted and sentenced to three years in jail and fined $5,550 in restitution. He was released early and signed with the Halifax Rainmen in Canada. Andre Levingston, the owner of the team, said, "Everybody makes mistakes, but I don't think they should be crucified for the rest of their life. You pay your debt to society and you humble yourself and you learn from your mistakes. So everybody deserves a second chance, maybe a third chance."

NBA career statistics

Regular season

|-
| align="left" | 2004–05
| align="left" | Utah
| 68 || 7 || 13.3 || .372 || .353 || .667 || 1.8 || .5 || .4 || .3 || 5.0
|-
| align="left" | 2005–06
| align="left" | NO/Oklahoma City
| 68 || 45 || 19.3 || .453 || .357 || .735 || 2.4 || 1.5 || .4 || .3 || 8.0
|-
| align="left" | 2006–07
| align="left" | Houston
| 39 || 1 || 14.4 || .452 || .250 || .653 || 2.1 || 1.0 || .3 || .3 || 4.9
|-
| align="left" | 2007–08
| align="left" | Houston
| 9 || 0 || 9.0 || .464 || .222 || .545 || 1.3 || .9 || .1 || .1 || 3.8
|-
| align="left" | 2007–08
| align="left" | Minnesota
| 27 || 18 || 25.2 || .516 || .214 || .753 || 4.2 || 2.1 || .7 || .5 || 8.4
|-
| align="left" | Career
| align="left" |
| 211 || 71 || 16.8 || .438 || .327 || .699 || 2.3 || 1.1 || .4 || .3 || 6.3

Playoffs

|-
| align="left" | 2007
| align="left" | Houston
| 3 || 0 || 3.0 || .333 || .000 || .000 || .3 || .0 || .0 || .0 || .7
|-
| align="left" | Career
| align="left" |
| 3 || 0 || 3.0 || .333 || .000 || .000 || .3 || .0 || .0 || .0 || .7

References

External links

1983 births
Living people
African-American basketball players
American expatriate basketball people in Canada
American expatriate basketball people in China
American expatriate basketball people in Russia
American expatriate basketball people in the Dominican Republic
American men's basketball players
American people convicted of burglary
American sportspeople convicted of crimes
Basketball players from Los Angeles
BC Nizhny Novgorod players
Houston Rockets players
Minnesota Timberwolves players
Nevada Wolf Pack men's basketball players
New Orleans Hornets players
Shooting guards
Small forwards
Utah Jazz draft picks
Utah Jazz players
Zhejiang Golden Bulls players
21st-century African-American sportspeople
20th-century African-American people